KSPK may refer to:

 KSPK-FM, a radio station (102.3 FM) licensed to serve Walsenburg, Colorado, United States
 KSPK-LD, a low-power television station (channel 28) licensed to serve Walsenburg, Colorado
 Spanish Fork-Springville Airport (ICAO code KSPK)